Karlsfeld is a municipality in the district of Dachau, in Bavaria, Germany. During World War II, it was the location of a subcamp of  Dachau concentration camp.

The municipality is situated 12 km northwest of Munich (centre).

The headquarters of MAN and MTU Aero Engines are located in Munich right on the border to Karlsfeld.

Karlsfeld railway station is served by the Munich S-Bahn on line S2.

Twin town
 Muro Lucano, Italy

External links
Karlsfeld Official web site

Notes

Dachau (district)